is a metro station on the Osaka Metro Tanimachi Line in Kita-ku, Osaka, Japan.

Layout
There is an island platform with 2 tracks underground.

Surroundings
the headquarters of Yamahisa Co., Ltd.
Hotel Daitoyo
Tengo Nakazaki Shopping Arcade

External links

 Official Site 
 Official Site

References

Osaka Metro stations
Railway stations in Japan opened in 1974